Stenaelurillus darwini is a jumping spider species found in Tanzania.

References

Salticidae
Arthropods of Tanzania
Spiders of Africa
Spiders described in 2000